The 1922 Estonian Football Championship was the second football league season in Estonia. It was played as a knock-out tournament between October 10 and October 29. Four teams took part in the competition – three from Tallinn and one from Narva. All the games were played at Wismari Stadium in Tallinn. The semi-finals were refereed by Alexander McKibbin, the final by August Silber.
Top scorer was Oskar Üpraus from Sport with 4 goals.
VS Sport Tallinn defended their title and won 4–2 against ESS Kalev Tallinn.

Semi-finals

Final

References

Estonian Football Championship
1